Ramsey Creek is a stream in Cape Girardeau and Scott counties, in the U.S. state of Missouri. It is a tributary of the Castor River Diversion Channel.

Ramsey Creek was named for Andrew Ramsay, an early settler.

See also
List of rivers of Missouri

References

Rivers of Cape Girardeau County, Missouri
Rivers of Scott County, Missouri
Rivers of Missouri